Novouralsky (masculine), Novouralskaya (feminine), or Novouralskoye (neuter) is the name of several rural localities in Russia:
Novouralsky (rural locality), a settlement in Novouralsky Rural Okrug of Tavrichesky District of Omsk Oblast
Novouralskoye, a selo in Novouralsky Rural Okrug of Pavlogradsky District of Omsk Oblast